Hurricane Sally was a destructive and slow-moving Atlantic hurricane, which was the first hurricane to make landfall in the U.S. state of Alabama since Ivan in 2004, coincidentally on the same date in the same place. The eighteenth named storm, and seventh hurricane of the extremely active 2020 Atlantic hurricane season, Sally developed from an area of disturbed weather which was first monitored over the Bahamas on September 10. The system grew a broad area of low-pressure on September 11, and was designated as a tropical depression late that day. Early the next day, the depression made landfall at Key Biscayne, and subsequently strengthened into Tropical Storm Sally that afternoon. Moderate northwesterly shear prevented significant intensification for the first two days, but convection continued to grow towards the center and Sally slowly intensified. On September 14, a center reformation into the center of the convection occurred, and data from a hurricane hunter reconnaissance aircraft showed that Sally rapidly intensified into a strong Category 1 hurricane. However, an increase in wind shear and upwelling of colder waters halted the intensification and Sally weakened slightly on September 15 before turning slowly northeastward. The storm rapidly weakened after landfall, before transitioning into an extratropical low at 12:00 UTC the next day. Sally's remnants lasted for another day as they moved off the coast of the Southeastern United States, before being absorbed into another extratropical storm on September 18.

Numerous watches and warnings were issued in anticipation of the imminent approach of Sally and several coastline counties and parishes on the Gulf Coast were evacuated. In South Florida, heavy rain led to localized flash flooding while the rest of peninsula saw continuous shower and thunderstorm activity due to asymmetric structure of Sally. Numerous tornadoes also occurred as well. Damage is estimated at $7.3 billion (2020 USD). Despite the destruction caused by the storm, the name Sally was not retired during the following year making Sally the costliest tropical cyclone in the North Atlantic on record that did not have its name retired.

Meteorological history

On September 4, a surface trough formed on the south and southwest side of then-Tropical Depression Omar near Bermuda. Omar dissipated the next day and its remnants move northeastward while the trough moved slowly south-southwestward over the Western Atlantic over the next several days, showing little to no signs of organization. At 00:00 UTC on September 10, the NHC began to monitor the area of disturbed weather as it was over the Bahamas for possible development. Over the next two days, convection rapidly increased, became better organized, and formed a broad area of low-pressure on September 11. At 18:00 UTC, the system had organized enough to be designated as Tropical Depression Nineteen. The system maintained its strength as it moved west over Florida, but the NHC noted that a strong convective burst near the center of the cyclone had weakened considerably. Despite this, the depression strengthened over land and became Tropical Storm Sally at 12:00 UTC that same day while over The Everglades, becoming the earliest 18th tropical or subtropical storm in an Atlantic hurricane season, surpassing the old mark of October 2, which was previously set by Hurricane Stan in 2005. As Sally moved offshore into the Gulf of Mexico at around 15:00 UTC and turned north-northwestward, it strengthened some more to  before northwesterly shear from a nearby upper-level low halted its intensification and gave the system a sheared appearance. Operationally, the NHC upgraded the storm to low-end Category 2 status at 21:00 UTC, but this was determined to be due to transient eyewall features and not a true estimate of the storm's intensity.

This increase in strength did not last long as six hours later, as another increase in wind shear and upwelling of colder waters caused by the storm's slow motion weakened Sally slightly early the next day. Despite its weakening, Sally began to develop a ragged eye, as shown on radar imagery, although it was open on its southern side. Sally continued to maintain its intensity as it slowed down tremendously and meandered first before turning northward, moving at only , although its pressure continued to fall. Unexpectedly, as Sally approached the coast, its eye quickly became better defined and it abruptly began to reintensify. By 05:00 UTC on September 16, the storm had reached into a Category 2 hurricane and was still strengthening as its northern eyewall began to move ashore in Baldwin County, Alabama. Sally's eye quickly disappeared as the storm rapidly weakened while it moved slowly inland. It was downgraded to a Category 1 hurricane at 13:00 UTC, and then to a tropical storm at 18:00 UTC. Sally further weakened to a tropical depression at 03:00 UTC on September 17 before becoming an extratropical low at 12:00 UTC that day. The low continued northeastward off the coast of the Carolinas, before losing its identity within a cold front around 12:00 UTC on September 18.

Preparations

Due to the possibility of the storm making landfall as a tropical storm, a tropical storm watch was issued for the coast of Southeastern Florida from south of Jupiter Inlet to north of Ocean Reef when advisories were first issued at 21:00 UTC on September 11. At 03:00 UTC on September 12, another tropical storm watch was issued for the Florida panhandle from the Ochlockonee River to the Okaloosa/Walton County line. That same day, numerous storm surge, tropical storm, and hurricane watches were then issued for a large portion of the US Gulf Coast east of New Orleans at 21:00 UTC, three hours after Sally was named. Many of these watches were then upgraded to warnings at 09:00 UTC on September 13 with more watches and warnings issued in the hours that followed. Several tornado, flash flood, and flood watches were issued.

States of emergency were declared in the states of Louisiana, Mississippi, and Alabama in preparation for Sally's arrival. Emergencies were also declared in the East Baton Rouge and St. Bernard parishes in Louisiana and Escambia, Santa Rosa and Okaloosa counties in Florida as well as New Orleans and Pensacola, Florida.

Louisiana
The mayor of New Orleans, LaToya Cantrell, issued an evacuation for areas outside the levee system of the city, due to expected storm surge.  The governor of Louisiana declared a state of emergency for the entire state, which was still recovering from the devastating effects of Hurricane Laura just three weeks earlier. Several parishes and areas were put under mandatory evacuation orders including all of St. Charles Parish, and parts of Orleans Parish, Jefferson Parish, Plaquemines Parish, and St. John the Baptist Parish.  Shelters were opened while public school and university classes were cancelled throughout southeastern Louisiana for September 15. FEMA declared that they will be bringing additional resources to Louisiana for the storm's aftermath and not diverting resources away from Hurricane Laura's relief efforts. Lakeshore Drive along Lake Pontchartrain was closed before the storm as well.

Mississippi

A state of emergency was declared on the night of Sunday, September 13, 2020. Some shelters were opened, although officials urged people who were evacuating to stay with friends, relatives, or in hotels, if possible, because of the threat of coronavirus superspreading. Mandatory evacuations were ordered for parts of Harrison County and Hancock County.

Alabama
Alabama governor Kay Ivey closed all beaches on the coast and called for evacuations of low-lying and flood prone areas. Additionally, Dauphin Island mayor Jeff Collier strongly encouraged all people to evacuate the west end after water started to encroach on the main roadway. A state of emergency was declared by governor Kay Ivey on September 14, 2020, as public schools and university classes were either cancelled or moved online in anticipation of the storm.

Impact

Warm and humid southerly flow associated with the circulation of Sally brought scattered showers and thunderstorms to western and central areas of Cuba on September 12–13.

The re-intensification and sudden track to the east by Sally prior to landfall caught many by surprise. Additionally, the storm's slow movement caused coastal areas between Mobile, Alabama, and Pensacola, Florida, to be in the northern eyewall for hours. Over 500,000 customers in Louisiana, Alabama, Florida, and Georgia lost power and parts of I-10, including the Escambia Bay Bridge, were shut down. Widespread tornado, special marine, severe thunderstorm, and flash flood warnings were issued, including several flash flood emergencies. Sally was the most destructive storm to strike the Alabama–Florida border region in nearly 20 years, which included Baldwin County in Alabama and Escambia County in Florida.

Florida

Due to the asymmetrical structure of Sally, almost all of Florida saw continuous shower and thunderstorm activity starting on September 12. A low-topped supercell in the outer rainbands of Sally prompted a tornado warning east of Tampa near Sebring on September 12. The next day, another storm prompted two tornado warnings in southwestern Lee County. Several special marine warnings were also issued for the Florida coast due to possible waterspouts. An EF0 tornado south of Marianna damaged a shed and uprooted several trees on September 16. Tropical storm-force gusts were reported in portions of the Miami metropolitan area.

The Panhandle area east of where Sally made landfall suffered the brunt of the storm in Florida. In Escambia County, which includes Pensacola, the sheriff kept police deputies out helping residents "as long as physically possible". Several area tornadoes also occurred. Damage totals are estimated to be $7 million to Gulf Breeze public facilities. The unincorporated Tiger Point saw  of rain, while Bellview saw . Many streets were flooded and several parked cars were totaled when water got into their engines. Late on September 15, twenty-two barges in the Pensacola Bay broke loose due to heavy surf. Five of the barges washed up near downtown while the sixth was involved in another collision. The seventh lodged itself underneath the Garcon Point Bridge while the final one became lodged underneath the Pensacola Bay Bridge, located between cities of Pensacola and the Gulf Breeze causing the bridge to be temporarily closed. The next morning, a crane fell onto the same bridge, destroying a portion of the roadway. The Florida Department of Transportation was unable to assess any possible damage to the bridge due to ongoing high   Water main breaks occurred inside the Gulf Breeze, causing the city to shut off water from the south side of Highway 98 inside city limits, where the majority of water main breaks occurred in order to isolate the leaks. Water main break also occurred in nearby Pensacola Beach, causing officials to advise residents to fill their bathtubs with water. The city of Panama City reported releases of raw sewage from several locations due to flooding from Hurricane Sally, prompting The Florida Department of Health to issue advises against swimming in Panama City until further notice. In Pensacola, a 27-year-old boater went missing when he left his home in a 12-foot jon, in an attempt to find his mother's pontoon boat that became untethered in the strong currents and whipping winds brought on by the hurricane; one week after his disappearance, his body was found washed ashore near the Blue Angel Recreation Park. Another person in Pensacola also died after succumbing to carbon monoxide poisoning from indoor generator use. The body of another missing boater, a 45-year-old female kayaker who had also gone missing at the height of the storm, was discovered, marking the third fatality of Pensacola and the state of Florida. The Shoal River in Okaloosa county saw its highest level in 20 years as a result of all the rain that fell from Sally. This resulted in parts of Crestview, Florida being evacuated and bridges on I-10 and SR 85 being closed to all traffic.

Alabama

Continuous onshore flow from Sally caused storm surge flooding to occur on Dauphin Island beginning early on September 14. Two unoccupied riverboat casinos in Bayou La Batre near Mobile broke loose due to the constant wave action with one of them hitting a dock. Major structural damage was recorded at the landfall point in Gulf Shores as well as Mobile. A pier in Gulf Shores that was destroyed in Hurricane Ivan in 2004 was partially destroyed again by storm surge from Sally just days after it had reopened following renovations. There were also several reports of damage to condos in the Gulf Shores with a few being destroyed. Meanwhile, in Downtown Mobile, a street light snapped, swinging wildly on its cable. A gas station was destroyed in Spanish Fort, Alabama. Several sewage overflows were reported across Mobile County following heavy rain from Hurricane Sally, causing contamination to Dog River and Rabbit Creek. One person was declared dead and one other missing in Orange Beach, an area most impacted by flooding. Another person died in Foley during the storm cleanup process. Over 2,000 broken poles and 4,300 trees on power lines left over 71,000 households and businesses in southern and central Baldwin County without power, representing 95% of the service area of a local electrical cooperative, Baldwin EMC. Only 5 of 22 substations remained in service the day after the storm. Two days after landfall, on September 18, Alabama governor Kay Ivey said in a news conference that 103,000 customers were still without power in Baldwin County, and another 60,000 in Mobile County. Five days after landfall, Baldwin EMC had restored power to close to 60,000 meters, representing 75% of their subscribers, but 18,197 meters remained without power.

Total damages in Alabama reached $311.895 million (2020 USD).

Elsewhere

The winds from the outer bands of Sally caused the south side of Lake Pontchartrain in Louisiana to overflow its banks, flooding Lakeshore Drive. However, no serious damage was reported as the storm veered farther east than originally forecast. Sally brought flooding to Mississippi, with the worst in Jackson County. At the peak of the storm, more than 10,000 people were without power along the Gulf Coast. Pascagoula police reported downed power lines and traffic lights in the city and a power outage on the eastern side of the city. Some parts of South Mississippi also reported uprooted trees and downed signs. Overall damage in Mississippi was expected to be much greater, but was reduced because the storm shifted east. In Georgia, six tornadoes were confirmed, of which two were rated EF1 while the other four were rated EF0. One person was killed and two others were injured after a large oak tree fell onto two homes and several cars in Atlanta. Two other fatalities occurred in metro Atlanta, one in Cobb County where a man died after a slick road caused a driver to lose control of his vehicle and hit the bus stop where the man was waiting at, and another in Gwinnett County where a 71-year-old woman was killed when a tree fell across the roadway, pinning her underneath. In North Carolina and South Carolina, 16 more tornadoes were also confirmed from September 17–18. Two of them were rated EF1 and two others were rated EFU, while all the others were rated EF0. One person was injured indirectly as he was cleaning up debris from his mobile home following an EF0 tornado in Sardis, South Carolina.

Aftermath
The storm caused widespread power outages across Baldwin County. Restoration of power took several days to bring back to 100%. The cities of Gulf Shores and Foley suffered the most extensive damage in Baldwin County. Due the large amount of damage in the city, a curfew was imposed in Mobile, Alabama, starting on September 16. Immediately after the storm, the Cajun Navy, a nonprofit rescue organization, began surveying damage in Alabama. The agricultural industry of Alabama, which was already under stress due to COVID-related impacts, suffered another devastating blow with many farmers' fields completely flooded, crops torn apart, and structures destroyed. Strong winds and heavy rainfall devastated crops, leaving many farmers across the state without hopes for a successful harvest.

See also

 Tropical cyclones in 2020
 List of Category 2 Atlantic hurricanes
 List of costliest Atlantic hurricanes
 List of Alabama hurricanes
 List of Mississippi hurricanes
 List of Florida hurricanes (2000-present)
 Hurricane Frederic (1979) – Category 4 hurricane that heavily impacted Alabama.
 Hurricane Elena (1985) –  Category 3 hurricane that also stalled in the northeastern Gulf of Mexico.
 Hurricane Danny (1997) – Stalled over Mobile Bay as a Category 1 hurricane.
 Hurricane Georges (1998) – Stalled in Mississippi before crawling eastward to the Florida Panhandle, dumping rainfall and causing extensive river flooding over similar areas.
 Hurricane Ivan (2004) – Affected the same areas on the same date 16 years earlier at Category 3 status, causing extensive damage.
 Tropical Storm Julia (2016) - A weak tropical storm that formed over Florida four years prior to Sally, causing minor damage.

References

External links 

 The National Hurricane Center's Advisory Archive on Hurricane Sally
 National Hurricane Center (NHC)

Tropical cyclones in 2020
2020 Atlantic hurricane season
Articles containing video clips
2020 in the Bahamas
2020 in Florida
2020 in Louisiana
2020 in Alabama
2020 in Mississippi
2020 in Georgia (U.S. state)
2020 in South Carolina
2020 in North Carolina
Hurricanes in the Bahamas
Hurricanes in Florida
Hurricanes in Louisiana
Hurricanes in Alabama
Hurricanes in Mississippi
Hurricanes in Georgia (U.S. state)
Hurricanes in South Carolina
Hurricanes in North Carolina
Category 2 Atlantic hurricanes